Grigorovich M-16 (alternative designation ShCh M-16, sometimes also Shchetinin M-16) was a successful Russian World War I-era biplane flying boat of the Farman type, developed from the M-9 by Grigorovich. Somewhat larger than the M-9, the M-16 was a version especially intended for winter operations, with better aerodynamic qualities.

Wartime use
Six M-16s fell into Finnish hands during the Russian Civil War. The first Finnish parachute jump was made on June 17, 1922 from a M-16 by Eero Erho. The aircraft were flown until 1923.
One additional plane was captured by the fledgling Estonian Air Force.

Variants
 M-16 : Two-seat reconnaissance floatplane.

Operators

Estonian Air Force

Finnish Air Force

Imperial Russian Navy

Soviet Naval Aviation

Specifications (M-16)

References

Bibliography
 Gerdessen, Frederik. "Estonian Air Power 1918 – 1945". Air Enthusiast, No. 18, April – July 1982. pp. 61–76. .

Biplanes
Floatplanes
1910s Russian military reconnaissance aircraft
Single-engined pusher aircraft
Military aircraft of World War I
M-16
Aircraft first flown in 1916